Yanguna is a Neotropical genus of firetips in the family Hesperiidae.

List of species
Yanguna cometes (Cramer, 1779)
Yanguna cosyra (Druce, 1875)
Yanguna erebus (Plötz, 1879)
Yanguna spatiosa Hewitson, 1870
Yanguna tetricus Bell, 1931
Yanguna thelersa (Hewitson, 1866)

References
Funet
Butterflies of America
Yanguna - Natural History Museum Lepidoptera genus database

External links
images representing Yanguna at Consortium for the Barcode of Life

Hesperiidae
Hesperiidae of South America
Hesperiidae genera
Taxa named by Edward Yerbury Watson